The Savoy Orpheans is a British dance band currently led by Alex Mendham. They were resident at the Savoy Hotel, London.

The band was formed by Debroy Somers, an ex-army bandmaster, in 1923. Both the Orpheans and the Savoy Havana Band were under the management of William de Mornys. The Orpheans were later led by the violinist Cyril Ramon Newton, and by the pianist Carroll Gibbons. On 15 June 1925, Somers conducted the Orpheans in the first British performance of George Gershwin's Rhapsody in Blue, alongside the Savoy Havana Band and Gershwin himself on piano. The performance was broadcast live by the BBC.

When de Morny's contractual arrangement with the Savoy Hotel company ended on 31 December 1927, the Orpheans disbanded. In early December 1927 there were newspaper reports of the Hotel management denying the rumour that the Savoy Orpheans, Savoy Havana Band and the Sylvians were to leave. Reg Batten, of the SHB, stayed on at the Hotel and led a band with the clumsy name "Savoy Orpheans (1928)".  This would indicate legal tussles over the rights to the original name.  It was not until 1931 that pianist Carroll Gibbons returned from working at MGM in Hollywood and, with saxophonist Howard Jacobs, formed a new ensemble "the Savoy Hotel Orpheans" for the hotel. The music writer Brian Rust wrote of this group, "it was a purely straight, typically smooth supper-club band."

The owner of the Savoy Hotel, Rupert D'Oyly, called the original Orpheans and their colleagues, "probably the best-known bands in Europe."  Among their popular songs was "Let's All Go to Mary's House" from 1925. D'Oyly Carte's judgment was echoed by Rust, who wrote in 1971 of the original Orpheans: "their very name personifies the Dancing Twenties … and their broad versatility … made this imprint in a way that no band had done before and few have achieved since".

The Savoy Orpheans name was revived by the Savoy Hotel in April 2022, and Alex Mendham was appointed bandleader and musical director of the > reformed group

.

References

External links
 Biography of Debroy Somers

Dance bands